The Scrabble Players Championship (formerly the North American SCRABBLE® Championship, and earlier the National SCRABBLE Championship) is the largest Scrabble competition in North America.  The event is currently held every year, and from 2004 through 2006 the finals were aired on ESPN and ESPN2. The 2022 event was held in Baltimore from July 23–27, 2022, with Michael Fagen emerging as champion.

Championship history
The first officially sanctioned Scrabble tournaments in the U.S. were spearheaded, organized and run by Joel Skolnick in the mid-1970s. Skolnick was a recreation director for the New York City Parks and Recreation Department. He approached Selchow and Righter in late 1972, and the first tournament, open to Brooklyn residents only, commenced on March 18, 1973. The Funk and Wagnalls Collegiate Dictionary was used to rule on challenges, and the official word judge was Skolnick's then-wife Carol. Carol's sister, Shazzi Felstein, who would later finish in ninth place at the first North American Invitational tournament, won the first preliminary round with 1,321 points over three games. The final round took place on April 15, 1973, and Jonathan Hatch was the winner of the first official Scrabble tournament

The summer of 1973 saw two more tournaments, held respectively at Grossingers (won by Minerva Kasowitz) and the Concord hotel (won by Harriet Zucker) in New York's Catskill region. Another two tournaments quickly followed in November that same year: in Baltimore, Gordon Shapiro topped approximately 400 contestants; and at the Brooklyn War Memorial approximately 2,000 people entered the nine weekly preliminary rounds of the first all–New York City Scrabble Championship. It was won by Bernie Wishengrad. The New York City Championship was thereafter held annually, jointly sponsored by Selchow and Righter and the NYC Department of Parks and Recreation.

The first national tournament was the North American Invitational, held May 19–21, 1978, in the Presidential Suite of the Loews Summit Hotel in New York City. Joel Skolnick and Carol Felstein, as usual, served as the tournament director and word judge, respectively. David Prinz took the $1,500 first prize, followed by Dan Pratt and Mike Senkiewicz.

In 1980, soon after the publication of the first Official Scrabble Players Dictionary, control of the national tournament passed to the National Scrabble Association. They continued to organize the tournament until 2008.

The official name of the tournament has been National SCRABBLE Championship in recent years, except in 2006 when it was named US SCRABBLE Open. In 2015, to recognize the longtime eligibility of Canadian members, it was renamed North American SCRABBLE Championship.

Since 2009, the tournament has been organized annually by NASPA Games (formerly known as North American SCRABBLE Players Association).  The first event under NASPA was held in Dayton, Ohio, in August 2009.  Since then, the championships have been held in various U.S. cities (chosen more or less based on a rotation between five regions: southeast, southwest, northeast, northwest, and central -- see table below).

The 2020 and 2021 events were canceled due to the ongoing COVID-19 pandemic.  The 2022 event, the first under the new SPC identity, was held in Baltimore on July 23–27, and was won by Michael Fagen, a data analyst from Quebec.

Collins play

In 2012, a Collins division for international-English play was added for the first time, won by Sam Kantimathi with a 24–7 record. In 2013, John O'Laughlin, creator of the Quackle software program, won the division with a 24–7 record, winning $2,500 and claiming his first NSC divisional title. Past world, national, and Canadian champion Adam Logan won the division easily in 2014 with a 23–4 record and four byes. Peter Armstrong prevailed over past champion Dave Wiegand in 2015, winning 3–2 in the final best-of-five series. David Eldar won the division in 2016 with a 27–4 record, beating past champion Logan by a six-game margin. Austin Shin won the top division in 2017 with a 22–9 record, prevailing over runner-up Dave Wiegand in the final round; this was the first year that Collins players were divided into two divisions. Austin repeated his win in 2022, defeating Waseem Khatri from Pakistan in a 5-game playoff.

Youth in the community

Bradley Robbins of New Hampshire became the first minor to win a division in 2008 with a 24–4 record in Division 6. In 2010, Richard Spence of Arizona won Division 4 with a 25.5–5.5 record, and in 2011 won Division 2 with a 25–6 record. In 2012, Amalan Iyengar of North Carolina won Division 4 with a 22–9 record. Also in 2012, Chris Canik of Texas won Division 3 with a 26–5 record, the highest record in that division's history. In 2013, Andy Hoang of North Carolina won Division 3 with a 23–8 record. Bradley Robbins and Andy Hoang are the only people to have won both the National School Scrabble Championship (2010 for Robbins, 2009 and 2012 for Hoang) and a division in the National Scrabble Championship (2008, Division 6 for Robbins & 2013, Division 3 for Hoang). Mack Meller of New York placed seventh in Division 1 in 2013. He started the 2014 event with a 7–0 record, giving him first place in Division 1 after the first day of the event, and again finished seventh overall.

Past events and Division 1 winners

NASPA Word List (NWL/OTCWL/OWL/OSPD)

Collins Scrabble Words (CSW)

See also
World Scrabble Championship
Canadian Scrabble Championship
National Scrabble Championship (UK)
Brand's Crossword Game King's Cup
World Youth Scrabble Championships
National School Scrabble Championship

References

Scrabble competitions
Scrabble on television
Annual events in North America